Pezhenga is a rural locality (a village) in Zavrazhskoye Rural Settlement, Nikolsky District, Vologda Oblast, Russia. The population was 2 as of 2002.

Geography 
Pezhenga is located 37 km southeast of Nikolsk (the district's administrative centre) by road. Vesyolaya Griva is the nearest rural locality.

References 

Rural localities in Nikolsky District, Vologda Oblast